Voglia di donna (i.e. "Desire of a woman") is a 1978 commedia sexy all'italiana film written and directed by  Franco Bottari. It consists of three segments starring Laura Gemser, Rena Niehaus,  and Ilona Staller.

Plot 
Bruno and his young African wife have fun recording their lovemaking on camera and then watching it afterwards. However, for some mysterious technical reason, their recording is broadcast to their entire building and their neighbors become their spectators.

Luisa cheats on her husband with a mature lawyer for which she is working as a secretary and tries to evade his attempts to expose her affair. The wife and her husband are arguing while they are driving and also while they are having coffee in a shop. He is accusing her of cheating with her boss while she is denying it. When he drops her off at her boss' office (which is also his home so he has a bed in there), she takes her clothes off immediately right after entering the door, joins her boss in his bed and has sex with him.

Gesuino, with the help of a mad scientist, is able to have an amorous encounter with the celebrity Cicciolina.

Cast 

 Laura Gemser as Princess 
 Rena Niehaus as  Luisa
 Ilona Staller as  Cicciolina 
 Gianni Cavina as Gesuino
 Carlo Giuffré as  Caimano
 Gabriele Tinti as  Bruno
  Stefano Amato as  Paolo's Friend
 Luciano Salce as The Fool
 Armando Brancia as The Priest
 Mauro Vestri as Pisellino

See also
 List of Italian films of 1978

References

External links

Commedia sexy all'italiana
1970s sex comedy films
1978 comedy films
1978 films
1970s Italian films